"Black Jesus" is a song by American artist Everlast. It was released in September 2000 as the lead single from his third album, Eat at Whitey's.

Content
The lyrics of the song are not about religion, as Everlast sings about how his career has had its ups and downs.

Track listing 
Black Jesus (Radio Edit) 4:20 
Children's Story - featuring Rahzel 3:20 
Graves To Dig 3:23 
Black Jesus (Album Version)

Music video
The video was directed by Jonas Åkerlund, and featured Everlast walking around the streets of London and the London Underground, passing very strange people, makes it to the top, and walks past clowns and little people. The video later ends when Everlast has made it to the top of a building. Two parts of the video were cut for TV, mainly the part where he is walking along the road and gets hit by car, and at the end of video where Everlast jumps off the top of the building.

Charts

References

2000 songs
2000 singles
Everlast (musician) songs